was a Sengoku period mountain-top castle in Osaka Prefecture, Japan.  Located on a 315.9 meter mountain. It was the original base of power for the Miyoshi clan.

History
Iimoriyama Castle was built by Kizawa Nagamasa and was later controlled by the Miyoshi clan.

Miyoshi Nagayoshi relocated  his home castle from Akutagawayama Castle to Iimoriyama Castle in 1560.

In 1564, Miyoshi Nagayoshi died in the castle.

The castle was listed as one of the Continued Top 100 Japanese Castles in 2017.

Preservation 
The castle is now only ruins, with some stone walls, moats and Dobashibridges.

References

Castles in Osaka Prefecture
Former castles in Japan
Ruined castles in Japan
Miyoshi clan